Strigocossus capensis is a moth in the  family Cossidae. It is found in the Democratic Republic of Congo, Kenya, Malawi, South Africa, Tanzania, Uganda and Zimbabwe.

The larvae feed on Cassia bicapsularis, Cassia siamea, Cassia laevigata, Senna didymobotrya, Ricinus communis, Pavonia columella and Hibiscus fuscus.

References

Zeuzerinae